Herrand von Wildonie ( 1248–1278) was a German nobleman and poet.

Life
Herrand was born around 1230. He belonged to an important noble family that held the hereditary office of high steward in the Duchy of Styria. His father, Ulrich, was the standard-bearer at the battle of Kressenbrunn in 1260. His mother's name is unknown. Herrand is numbered Herrand II after his grandfather, who died around 1222. Sometime before 1260, Herrand married Perhta (or Perchta), a daughter of the poet Ulrich von Lichtenstein. They had two sons, Ulrich von Eppenstein and Herrand III von Wildonie.

Herrand was involved in the War of the Babenberg Succession that followed the death of the last Babenberg Duke of Austria in 1246. He entered the service of King Béla IV of Hungary in 1249, before joining King Ottokar II of Bohemia in 1254. In 1268, he was temporarily imprisoned by Ottokar. In 1276, he entered the service of King Rudolf I of Germany. He was recorded alive for the last time in 1278 when, after Rudolf's victory in the battle on the Marchfeld, he attended the king's court in Vienna. He was dead by 1282.

Works

Herrand's surviving works consist of four short narrative poems and the lyrics of three songs in the Minnesang tradition. The narrative poems are:

Diu getriu kone (The Faithful Wife)
Der verkêrte wirt (The Deceived Husband)
Von dem blôzen keiser (The Naked Emperor)
Von der katzen (The Cat)

The songs are:

Lieber sumer (Lovely Summer)
Des meien zît (The Maytime)
Wir suln hôhen muot empfâhen (We Must All be Light of Heart)

Notes

Bibliography

People from the Duchy of Styria
13th-century births
13th-century deaths
13th-century German poets
German male poets
Minnesingers